Oilea spinalis is a species of beetle in the family Carabidae, the only species in the genus Oilea.

References

Ctenodactylinae